James McBurney Feeney (23 June 1921 – March 1985) was a Northern Irish professional footballer. During his career he made almost 100 appearances for Swansea City and over 200 appearances for Ipswich Town. Feeney's son and grandson, both named Warren, later represented Northern Ireland.

Club career

Born in Belfast, Feeney began his career as a junior with Crusaders. After they withdrew from football in 1941 due to the Second World War, he moved to Linfield with whom he played throughout the war as a winger before moving to full back. He helped the side win three wartime league championships and Irish Cup's before moving to Swansea Town in December 1946. After several years at Vetch Field, Feeney was appointed team captain and led Swansea to the Division Three South title before moving to Ipswich Town in March 1950. He made over 200 appearances at Portman Road before retiring in April 1956.

In 1957, he played abroad in Canada's National Soccer League with Toronto Ulster United. The following season he served as a player-coach for Ulster United. He re-signed with Toronto for the 1959 NSL season.

International career

Feeney represented Ireland twice in wartime internationals, later winning his first full cap on 27 November 1946 in a 0–0 draw with Scotland. His second and final cap came three years later in a 9–2 defeat to England during the 1950 British Home Championship.

Managerial career 
Feeney was the player-coach for Toronto Ulster United in 1958 and briefly served as the club's general manager. He was also named the National Soccer League's All-Star head coach in 1958. In 1964, he was named the head coach for St. Andrews of the Ontario Soccer League. Following his time in Canada, Feeney returned to Northern Ireland, managing Ards' reserves.

References

External links
Jim Feeney at Pride of Anglia

1921 births
1985 deaths
Association footballers from Belfast
Association footballers from Northern Ireland
Association football defenders
Crusaders F.C. players
Linfield F.C. players
Swansea City A.F.C. players
Ipswich Town F.C. players
Toronto Ulster United players
English Football League players
Canadian National Soccer League players
Pre-1950 IFA international footballers
Jim
Ireland (IFA) wartime international footballers
Canadian National Soccer League coaches
Football managers from Northern Ireland